The men's hammer throw event at the 1996 World Junior Championships in Athletics was held in Sydney, Australia, at International Athletic Centre on 23 and 24 August.  A 7257g (senior implement) hammer was used.

Medalists

Results

Final
24 August

Qualifications
23 Aug

Group A

Group B

Participation
According to an unofficial count, 27 athletes from 21 countries participated in the event.

References

Hammer throw
Hammer throw at the World Athletics U20 Championships